Graceville High School is a public high school in Graceville, Florida. The school's teams compete with the Tigers mascot and the school colors are black, orange, and white. The school opened in 1885. In 2021, Graceville High School was ranked 516-602nd within Florida. The total minority enrollment is 60%, and 50% of students are economically disadvantaged. Florida Supreme Court Justice Ricky Polston was valedictorian of his class of 1973.

References

Public high schools in Florida
High schools in Jackson County, Florida
Educational institutions established in 1885
1885 establishments in Florida